The 1975–76 Detroit Red Wings season was the 50th season of competition for the Detroit franchise and 42nd as the Red Wings. The Wings finished fourth in the Norris Division and did not qualify for the playoffs.

Offseason

Regular season

Final standings

Schedule and results

Playoffs

Player statistics

Regular season
Scoring

Goaltending

Note: GP = Games played; G = Goals; A = Assists; Pts = Points; +/- = Plus-minus PIM = Penalty minutes; PPG = Power-play goals; SHG = Short-handed goals; GWG = Game-winning goals;
      MIN = Minutes played; W = Wins; L = Losses; T = Ties; GA = Goals against; GAA = Goals-against average;  SO = Shutouts;

Awards and records

Transactions

Draft picks
Detroit's draft picks at the 1975 NHL Amateur Draft held in Montreal, Quebec.

Farm teams

See also
1975–76 NHL season

References

External links

Detroit Red Wings seasons
Detroit
Detroit
Detroit Red Wings
Detroit Red